Zieria prostrata  commonly known as headland zieria, is a plant in the citrus family Rutaceae and is endemic to the Coffs Harbour district in New South Wales. It is a prostrate shrub with leaves composed of three leaflets, and flowers with four pink to white petals. It is only known from four headlands and is classified as an endangered species.

Description

The flowers are pink in the bud stage but turn white as they open. They are arranged in groups of mostly 3 to 7 (sometimes up to 32) in leaf axils and the groups are usually much shorter than the leaves. Flowering mainly occurs from late August to late September or October and is followed by fruit which is a follicle composed of up to four sections joined at the base and which burst open to release their seeds when ripe.

Taxonomy and naming
Zieria prostrata was first formally described in 1996 by James Andrew Armstrong in Australian Native Plants: propagation, cultivation and use in landscaping. The specific epithet (prostrata) is a Latin word meaning "down flat" or "laid low".

Distribution and habitat
This zieria grows in low coastal heathland on headlands in a single nature reserve near Coffs Harbour. It is difficult to count the population size but the National Parks and Wildlife Service estimated about one thousand individuals in 1998. Other headlands along the New South Wales coastline have similar zierias and it is possible that other populations of this species may yet be discovered.

Conservation
Zieria prostrata is classified as "Endangered" under the Commonwealth Government Environment Protection and Biodiversity Conservation Act 1999 (EPBC) Act. The main threat to its survival is invasion by introduced species, especially kikuyu (Pennisetum clandestinum), bitou bush (Chrysanthemoides monilifera) and lantana (Lantana camara).

References

prostrata
Sapindales of Australia
Flora of New South Wales
Plants described in 1996